Re. is the third studio album by Japanese pop singer Aya Ueto. It was released on December 8, 2004 on Flight Master.

Background
Re. was released only nine months after her second album and unlike her previous efforts, it includes only eleven tracks. The album is mostly made up of winter ballads. The album title, Re., is meant to designate a "response" to her previous album, Message.

Chart performance
Re. peaked at #11 on the Oricon Daily Albums Chart and debuted at #19 on the Weekly Albums Chart with 19,017 copies sold. The album charted for a total of seven weeks and sold over 35,000 copies.

Track listing

Charts and sales

References

2004 albums
Aya Ueto albums
Concept albums
Pony Canyon albums